Hayden (also Hardenburgh or Six Mile) is an unincorporated community and census-designated place (CDP) in central Spencer Township, Jennings County, Indiana, United States. As of the 2020 census it had a population of 501.

Geography
It lies along CR700W, west of the town of Vernon, the county seat of Jennings County. U.S. Route 50 passes through the CDP south of the village center; the highway leads northeast  to North Vernon and west  to Seymour.

The Hayden post office has the ZIP code of 47245.

Demographics
As of the 2020 census, Hayden had a population of 501. Of those residents, 459 were white, three were Black, four were Native American or Alaskan Native, two were of some other race, and 33 were of two or more races.

History
Hayden was platted in 1854.

Notable people
 Cliff Daringer, Federal League baseball player
 Rolla Daringer, Major League Baseball player
 Mike Simon, Major League Baseball player
 Edgar Whitcomb, former governor of Indiana and author

Climate
The climate in this area is characterized by hot, humid summers and generally mild to cool winters.  According to the Köppen Climate Classification system, Hayden has a humid subtropical climate, abbreviated "Cfa" on climate maps.

References

Census-designated places in Jennings County, Indiana
Census-designated places in Indiana